Bahumati is a 2007 Indian Telugu-language romantic comedy-drama film written and directed by S. V. Krishna Reddy under R.R Movie Makers. The film stars Venu Thottempudi, Sangeetha, Shabana Khan and Ali.

Plot
Venkataramana is an honest police officer who refuses to accept bribes and always stands by his word. He is an orphan and dreams of helping the other orphans. His friend plays a cop who misses no opportunity to make money fining pedestrians for not wearing a helmet.

Venkataramana's wife Bhanumathi is a middle-class girl who dreams of riches and a costly lifestyle. The honest cop cannot fulfill her demands and suffers constant harassment from his wife who denies him conjugal bliss.

The hero buys a lottery ticket for his wife. However, when he eats at a restaurant, he is unable to pay the bill. Thus he promises to share half the prize money from his lottery with Dharani (Shabhana Khan), who is a waitress at the hotel.

Venkataramana wins 100 million in the lottery and as promised he gives 50 million to Dharani. Bhanumathi cannot digest this fact and she suspects that her husband is having an affair with the waitress. Her suspicion is further strengthened with the exposé on the intrusive media. She files for divorce and the full 100 million prize money. She wins the case and Venkataramana is left on the streets.

The fate of the newly divorced couple and Dharani is disclosed in the climax.

Cast

Venu Thottempudi as Venkata Ramana
Sangeetha as Bhanumathi
Shabana Khan (debut)
Ali
Kota Srinivasa Rao
Dharmavarapu Subrahmanyam
Giri Babu
Krishna Bhagawan
Brahmanandam
AVS
Shankar Melkote
Surekha Vani
Sunil
Sridhar Rao
M. S. Narayana
Satya Krishnan
Pavala Syamala
Duvvasi Mohan

References

External links

2007 films
2007 romantic comedy-drama films
2000s Telugu-language films
Films directed by S. V. Krishna Reddy
Films scored by S. V. Krishna Reddy
Indian remakes of American films
Telugu remakes of Hindi films